Lord John Townshend PC (19 January 1757 – 23 February 1833), styled The Honourable John Townshend until 1787, was a British Whig politician.

Background
Townshend was the second son of Field Marshal George Townshend, 1st Marquess Townshend, by his first wife Charlotte Compton, 16th Baroness Ferrers of Chartley. George Townshend, 2nd Marquess Townshend, was his elder brother and Charles Townshend his uncle. He was educated at Eton and St John's College, Cambridge.

Political career
Townshend was elected to the House of Commons for Cambridge University in 1780, a seat he held until 1784, and later represented Westminster from 1788 to 1790 and Knaresborough from 1793 to 1818. He was admitted to the Privy Council in 1806 and served under Lord Grenville as Paymaster of the Forces (alongside Lord Temple) between 1806 and 1807.

Family

Townshend married in 1787 Georgiana Anne Fawkener, daughter of William Poyntz, and the divorced wife of William Fawkener. Their elder son Charles Fox Townshend was the founder of the Eton Society but died young. Their younger son John became an admiral in the Royal Navy and succeeded his first cousin as 4th Marquess Townshend in 1855. Their daughter Elizabeth Frances Townshend (2 August 1789 –10 April 1862 Nice) married 20 October 1813 Captain Augustus Clifford R.N., later Sir Augustus Clifford, 1st Bt (1788-1877), illegitimate son of the 5th Duke of Devonshire and his mistress, Lady Elizabeth Foster, née Hervey, later the Duke's second wife (1811). Mrs Clifford became Lady Clifford in 1838 when her husband was raised to a baronetcy.  Townshend died in February 1833, aged 76. Lady Georgiana Anne died in 1851.

See also
Marquess Townshend

Notes

References 

1757 births
1833 deaths
People educated at Eton College
Alumni of St John's College, Cambridge
Younger sons of marquesses
Members of the Parliament of Great Britain for English constituencies
Members of the Parliament of Great Britain for Cambridge University
British MPs 1780–1784
British MPs 1784–1790
British MPs 1790–1796
British MPs 1796–1800
Members of the Parliament of the United Kingdom for English constituencies
UK MPs 1801–1802
UK MPs 1802–1806
UK MPs 1806–1807
UK MPs 1807–1812
UK MPs 1812–1818
John Townshend
Members of the Privy Council of the United Kingdom
Lords of the Admiralty